Lhodrak Seykhar Dratshang (also Sekargutho Monastery or Sey Lhakhang) is a Buddhist monastic school in Bumthang (Bhutan) near Jakar city. The name means Golden Temple.  The school was established in 1963, dedicated to Marpa Lotsawa.

References 

Buddhist monasteries in Bhutan
Tibetan Buddhist monasteries
1963 in Bhutan
Tibetan Buddhism in Bhutan